Ennomos subsignaria, the elm spanworm moth, is a moth of the family Geometridae. The species was first described by Jacob Hübner in 1823. It is found in North America from Texas (south) to Alberta (northwest) and east to the Atlantic coast. It is recorded infrequently in Great Britain through accidental importation in asparagus.

The wingspan is 35–40 mm. Adults are pure white except for yellow branches on the antennae. They are on wing from late May to August. one generation per year.

The larvae feed on elm, apple, birch, maple, and oak.

Gallery

References

Moths described in 1823
Moths of North America
Ennomini
Taxa named by Jacob Hübner